Andrew David Smith (born 1 February 1951) is a British Labour Party politician who was the Member of Parliament (MP) for Oxford East from 1987 until 2017. He served in the Cabinet as Chief Secretary to the Treasury from 1999 to 2002 and then as Secretary of State for Work and Pensions from 2002 to 2004.

Smith retired from the House of Commons at the 2017 general election.

Early life
Smith was educated at Reading School and St John's College, Oxford, where he gained a BA and BPhil. He was the Member Relations Officer for Oxford and Swindon Co-op Society from 1979 to 1987. He became an Oxford City Councillor in 1976, leaving the council in 1987. He contested Oxford East in 1983.

Parliamentary career
Smith was the Member of Parliament for Oxford East, which he won in 1987, defeating Conservative MP Steven Norris. After Labour won government in the 1997 general election he was made a minister in the Department for Education and Employment. He was Chief Secretary to the Treasury from 1999 to 2002, when he became Secretary of State for Work and Pensions; he resigned from this post on 6 September 2004, to spend more time with his family. He won re-election in his Oxford East seat in the 2005 General Election, but saw his majority slashed by 90%.

He is best remembered by some for his opposing of the privatisation of air traffic control in 1996 stating "Our air is not for sale" only for Labour to switch policies and thereby propose a Public–private partnership for the National Air Traffic Services. Others point to his stewardship of the Department for Work and Pensions and his focus on reducing child poverty when minister there.

Smith was also the chair and one of the founding members of the International Parliamentarians for West Papua, launched in October 2008.

Smith occasionally rebelled against his party in Parliament, on issues such as a third runway at Heathrow, the Government's renewal of Trident, and notably backed opposition Liberal Democrats motions on votes concerning the rights of Gurkhas to remain in Britain and the introduction of single transferable vote for elections.

In 2005 the Liberal Democrats came within 963 votes of winning the seat, with the drop in support for Labour widely attributed to the Iraq War, but in 2010 Andrew Smith secured a comfortable victory with a 4.1% swing to Labour, bucking the national trend. Similarly, in 2015, Smith was re-elected with 50% of the vote, an increase of 7.5% over 2010.

In the 2010 Labour Party leadership election, Smith supported Ed Balls. In the 2015 Labour leadership election, with minutes to spare before the deadline for nominees ended, Smith nominated Jeremy Corbyn despite not actually supporting Corbyn. Smith nominated Corbyn because he wanted a "broad debate" about the direction of the Labour Party. Smith was the 35th Labour MP to nominate Corbyn, which gave Corbyn the minimum number of votes he needed to appear on the ballot.

He supported Owen Smith's unsuccessful candidacy in the 2016 Labour leadership election after the Parliamentary Labour Party declared non-confidence in Corbyn's leadership.

On 19 April 2017, Smith announced that he would not seek re-election in the 2017 general election.

Personal life
Smith was married to Valerie Miles, a former Lord Mayor of Oxford, county councillor on Oxfordshire County Council and city councillor on Oxford City Council from 26 March 1976 until her death in 2015. They had a son, Luke. Smith lives in the southeast Oxford council estate of Blackbird Leys.

References

External links
 Andrew Smith MP official site

 BBC Politics page 

|-

|-

|-

1951 births
Living people
Alumni of St John's College, Oxford
British Secretaries of State
Labour Party (UK) MPs for English constituencies
Members of the Privy Council of the United Kingdom
People educated at Reading School
Secretaries of State for Work and Pensions
UK MPs 1987–1992
UK MPs 1992–1997
UK MPs 1997–2001
UK MPs 2001–2005
UK MPs 2005–2010
UK MPs 2010–2015
UK MPs 2015–2017
Chief Secretaries to the Treasury